Barbara Jane Bedford (born November 9, 1972), who competed as BJ Bedford, currently known by her married name, Barbara Miller, is an American former competition swimmer, Olympic champion, and former world record-holder.

Bedford represented the United States at the 2000 Summer Olympics in Sydney, Australia.  She was a member of the U.S. team that won the Olympic gold medal in the women's 4×100-meter medley relay and set a new world record of 3:58.30 in the event final.  Her record-setting teammates included Megan Quann (breaststroke), Jenny Thompson (butterfly), and Dara Torres (freestyle).

Bedford attended high school at swimming powerhouse Peddie School in Hightstown, New Jersey and is the sister of competitive swimmer Fritz Bedford.

See also
 List of Olympic medalists in swimming (women)
 List of University of Texas at Austin alumni
 List of World Aquatics Championships medalists in swimming (women)
 Pan American Games records in swimming
 World record progression 4 × 100 metres medley relay

References

1972 births
Living people
American female backstroke swimmers
American female freestyle swimmers
World record setters in swimming
Medalists at the FINA World Swimming Championships (25 m)
Olympic gold medalists for the United States in swimming
Peddie School alumni
People from Hanover, New Hampshire
Swimmers at the 1995 Pan American Games
Swimmers at the 2000 Summer Olympics
Texas Longhorns women's swimmers
World Aquatics Championships medalists in swimming
Medalists at the 2000 Summer Olympics
Pan American Games gold medalists for the United States
Pan American Games medalists in swimming
Universiade medalists in swimming
Universiade gold medalists for the United States
Medalists at the 1991 Summer Universiade
Medalists at the 1993 Summer Universiade
Medalists at the 1995 Pan American Games
Swimmers from New Hampshire